The United States Senate election of 1928 in New York was held on November 6, 1928. Incumbent Democratic Senator Royal S. Copeland was re-elected to a second term, defeating Republican Alanson B. Houghton.

Democratic nomination

Candidates
Royal S. Copeland, incumbent Senator since 1923

Convention
After speeches celebrating Copeland's support for tolerance for Catholics and immigration reform, his renomination was carried by acclamation.

Republican nomination

Candidates
George R. Fearon, State Senator from Onondaga County
Alanson B. Houghton, U.S. Ambassador to Great Britain

Convention

General election

Candidates
 McAlister Coleman, activist and author (Socialist)
 Royal S. Copeland, incumbent Senator (Democratic)
 Alanson B. Houghton, U.S. Ambassador to the Great Britain (Republican)
 Henry Kuhn, perennial candidate (Socialist Labor)
Robert Minor, cartoonist and journalist (Workers)

Results

References

1928
New York
United States Senate